Sibundoy (Camsá: Tabanok "village") is a town and municipality in the Putumayo Department of the Republic of Colombia.

The town existed well before the Spanish came in 1534. The Inca, under Huayna Cápac, conquered the local people in 1492 and established a Quechua-speaking settlement; their descendants are the modern Inga people. Most of the citizens of Sibundoy are indigenous, and wear long, blue and violet ponchos called kapisaius and baitas.

Sibundoy is known for mask carving and other traditional crafts. In the town's park, the trunks of fallen trees are carved with symbols from the mythology of the Inga and Kamsá nations.

One especially important event is the Carnival of the Return of the First People, which is both a fun event and key celebration of local mythology.

See also
 Sibundoy people, the indigenous people of the region

Notes

Municipalities of Putumayo Department